Usgentia vespertalis is a species of moth in the family Crambidae. It is found in Greece and on Sicily, as well as in Turkey.

References

Moths described in 1851
Odontiinae
Moths of Europe
Moths of Asia